Sally Freeman (born 20 February 1974) is a British diver. She competed in the women's 10 metre platform event at the 2000 Summer Olympics.

References

External links
 

1974 births
Living people
British female divers
Olympic divers of Great Britain
Divers at the 2000 Summer Olympics
Sportspeople from Plymouth, Devon